Martín Armando Reynoso Gutiérrez (born May 1, 1966) is a Mexican former professional baseball right-handed pitcher.

Career
During a 12-year baseball career, Reynoso compiled 68 wins, 554 strikeouts, and a 4.74 earned run average. That ‘93 season turned out to be Reynoso’s best in the big leagues. As the ace of the Rockies, he started 30 games, winning 12, with 4 complete games, 117 strikeouts in 189 innings pitched. During the ‘94 and ‘95 seasons he only saw action in 29 games due to multiple injuries, starting 27 and winning 10. In 1996 started 30 games going 8–9 for the Rockies. That same year, Reynoso was on the mound for the Diamondbacks when slugger Barry Bonds stole his 40th base of the season to become the second player in major league history with 40 home runs and 40 stolen bases. In 1997, Reynoso saw limited action for the New York Mets, however he won 7 of his 11 starts of the season, going 7–3 with a 3.89 ERA. In 1999 he started 27 games for the Arizona Diamondbacks, going 10–6 in 167 innings pitched. In the year 2000 he started 30 games for the Diamondbacks, winning 11 decisions and 2 complete games in 170 innings pitched. 

Reynoso was the last player on the Atlanta Braves to wear number 42 before it was retired by Major League Baseball in 1997. In 2001, Reynoso gave up the first career home run to Albert Pujols.

For his career, Reynoso averaged 12 wins, 33 starts and 176 innings pitched per every 162 games played. 

Reynoso was the bullpen coach for the Mexico national baseball team in the 2009 World Baseball Classic.

In March 2010, Armando was inducted to the Mexican Professional Baseball Hall of Fame.

External links

1966 births
Living people
Arizona Diamondbacks players
Atlanta Braves players
Baseball players from San Luis Potosí
Colorado Rockies players
Colorado Springs Sky Sox players
Major League Baseball pitchers
Major League Baseball players from Mexico
Mexican Baseball Hall of Fame inductees
Mexican expatriate baseball players in the United States
Mexican League baseball pitchers
New York Mets players
Norfolk Tides players
People from San Luis Potosí City
Richmond Braves players
Saraperos de Saltillo players
St. Lucie Mets players
Tucson Sidewinders players